This is a list of characters featured in the Japanese anime television series  and subsequent spin-offs.

Shuffle Alliance 
The Shuffle Alliance is a public team composed of five members: Domon Kasshu, Chibodee Crocket, Georges de Sand, Tsai T'zu Hsi, and Argo Gursky - each the best combatants of their generation. Each member bears the crest of a certain playing card; King of Hearts, Queen of Spades, Jack of Diamonds, Ace of Clubs, Black Joker, hence the name Shuffle Alliance. Each member's crest can be seen on their right hand and often appears when special attacks are performed or when each member is in an emotional state. The Alliance watches humanity from the shadows and often steps in and appears at times to prevent human conflicts from going too far.

The original Shuffle Alliance was composed of the five members - Master Asia, Black Joker (Tris Surgeyrev), Jack of Diamonds (Nassius Kircher), Queen of Spades (Max Burns), and Ace of Clubs (Alan Lee). Master Asia, who grew disillusioned following his victory during the 12th Gundam Fight, eventually left and bestowed his title to Domon Kasshu before leaving the group. Eventually, the four remaining members would face Master Asia around the time of the 13th Gundam Fight at Shinjuku, battling Domon's DG Cell-infected friends before sacrificing themselves to burn away the DG Cells. In the process this saves Chibodee Crocket, Georges de Sand, Argo Gursky, and Tsai T'zu Hsi, from being slaves of the Dark Gundam and also bestows them with the crests of the Queen of Spades, the Jack of Diamonds, the Black Joker and the Club Ace.

  
 Protagonist of the series and pilot of the Shining Gundam and later, the God Gundam (Burning Gundam in the American versions), Domon Kasshu is the representative fighter of Neo Japan. Before the 13th Gundam Fight, it is known that Domon had spent a total of 10 years training under Master Asia. Afterwards, Domon inherited the title "King of Hearts" along with the King Of Hearts crest on his right hand. During the 13th Gundam Fight, he is on a mission to find his brother Kyoji who has stolen the JDG-009X Devil Gundam and to free his father, who was placed in cryogenic suspension due to his involvement with the Devil Gundam. This is why he agreed to represent Neo-Japan in the Thirteenth Gundam Fight.

 Strong, short-tempered, and determined, Domon is willing to do whatever it takes to complete his mission and is sometimes uncaring because he sees nothing but the mission before him. Rein Mikamura is a big part of his life as she is both a childhood friend and his partner through the Gundam Fight. He is very psychologically dependent on her and the mere possibility of losing Rein makes him either go ballistic or feel lost. It is learned later that he has deep feelings for her as well. He has had trouble accepting the fact that his martial arts teacher, Master Asia, was on the side of the Devil Gundam, but got over it. With the help of his surrogate teacher Schwarz Bruder, he became a much better fighter. At the end of the series, he learns the truth about both the Devil Gundam incident and why Master Asia sided with the JDG-009X Devil Gundam (Dark Gundam in the American Versions). At the end of the series he confesses his love to Rein and she agrees to live on Earth with him. Domon and Rein got married at the end.

 

  
Pilot of the Gundam Maxter and representative of Neo-America. His fighting style is boxing. After the loss of his mother, he grew up in the rough streets of New York City, fighting for his life and support until he finally made his dreams come true, by going to the Neo-America space colony and later representing it in the Gundam Fight. After Domon Kasshu defeats Chibodee in a Gundam Fight in Chibodee's hometown of New York City, a friendly rivalry develops between the two. Later on, Chibodee is possessed by DG Cells and fights Domon in Tokyo, but is stopped by the Shuffle Alliance. After being healed of the DG Cells, he becomes the Shuffle Alliance's new Queen of Spades. He had a constant fear of clowns in one episode due to an event when he was young, although he eventually overcame his fear after fighting an opponent who dressed as a clown. Chibodee doesn't get along that well with fellow Gundam Fighter/Shuffle Alliance member, Georges de Sand at first, who is also in a sense his opposite. Though they're good teammates and friends, they both grew up in different financial classes, and fight for different, pride-based reasons. His crew are four ladies: Shirley, Janet, Bunny, and Cath, which is all the "protection" he needs. His special techniques include Burning Punch and bursting rail machine-gun punch. He also makes a guest appearance in one manga panel for Karate Shoukoushi Kohinata Minoru Manga Chapter 122 page 11.

Neo America, like Neo France, did not separate when they got their own colony they stayed together while most nations did not. While the Congress and most congressional offices move to the colony, the President and the Supreme Court stayed on Earth in Washington D.C. along with the military headquarters at the Pentagon in Arlington. Because of this, Washington D.C. and the area surrounding it was made by the colonies federation a 'no Gundam Fight zone'. The population of the colony and earth bound nation is 50/50. The reason for this is better infrastructure and because the military will protect their infrastructure by using force on Gundam fighters who do not follow their Gundam Fight rules.

  
 Pilot of the Gundam Rose and representative of Neo-France. Georges's fighting style is fencing. Georges considers himself a knight and fights for the pride of his nation. Georges grew up in a rich and noble family that is loyal to Neo-France and the De Sand family is one of the few noble families to remain on Earth. Georges's only fear is his involvement in the Marseilles Tragedy. This is where he was in a competition which would decide who Neo-France's representative would be. His opponent Jean Pierre Mirabeau was disqualified for his dirty tactics. With his Mirage Gundam, Mirabeau stood in front of the crowd preventing George from attacking. The King of Neo-France was disgusted by this and declared Georges the winner by default. Mirabeau then tried to kill the King in revenge. Georges tried to stop this, but Mirabeau's missiles were redirected into the stands killing thousands of spectators. Georges later became the new Jack of Diamonds for the Shuffle Alliance and got a chance to face Mirabeau again when he escaped from a prison colony with the help of the Devil Gundam. When Mirabeau arrived in Guyana where Georges was training for the finals, Georges was able to overcome his fear of the past used his new power as the Jack of Diamonds to heal Mirabeau, who was possessed by DG cells. At one point, by stealing Gundam Rose from its hangar, he risked his Gundam Fighter position and the honor of his family, when the King refused for him to fight Domon Kasshu in the finals. But later after seeing the match, the King admitted he was wrong for his earlier decision and agreed to overlook the theft. He also has little regard for ruffians and didn't like Domon at first when he interrupted a match, and he doesn't always get along with Chibodee Crockett, though they do work together to help Domon on Lantau Island. His crew is his butler Raymond Bishop and he is adored by Maria Louise, the tomboyish Princess of Neo-France. His name is based on the French female author George Sand. His special techniques include Rose Screamers, Rose Bitz, and Rose Hurricane. 

  
 Pilot of the Dragon Gundam and representative of Neo-China. His fighting style is shaolinquan and is the youngest Gundam Fighter at 16 years old. When the colonies were formed, most of the Shaolin followers defected to the colonies' Chikurn temples. T'zu Hsi's mission is to win the Gundam fight and convince the Neo-China government to resurrect the Shaolin Temple. His grandfather participated in the Fourth Gundam fight, and his father was stricken with a terminal illness. Now it is T'zu Hsi's turn to try to revive the Shaolin temple. When Domon first met him, he was accused of attacking Neo-China, but it turned out that he was separated from his Gundam and used Domon to help get it back. Later on, he became the Shuffle Alliance's new Ace of Clubs (Club Ace in Japan). In the finals, he met a girl named Cecile to whom he becomes smitten with, but it turned out she is the sister of his upcoming opponent, Hans Holgar, Neo-Denmark's Gundam Fighter and pilot of the Mermaid Gundam; they had to part ways, though promising to meet again later. His crew are two elderly Shaolin Monks, Zuizen and Keiun who are also dedicated in the mission, although they can be overprotective to T'zu Hsi. His special techniques include Dragon Fire, Feilong Flag, Houka Kyouten Juuzetsujin, and Shin Ryuusei Kochouken. His name is based on the Chinese Empress T'zu-hsi. 

  
 Pilot of the Bolt Gundam and representative of Neo-Russia. Argo uses grappling-style wrestling moves and unlike many of his fellow Gundam Fighters, doesn't rely on special techniques at first. At one time, he was a Space Pirate Captain; although he was a criminal, he valued life and never killed anyone. He was caught and was forced to become Neo-Russia's Gundam Fighter to ensure his crew's safety and had a bomb placed on his chest so he can't get out of line. When he first met Domon, Neo-Russia's tactic was to lure in Gundam Fighters and arrest them so they don't have to fight. Argo was deeply disgusted by this tactic and staged an escape to fight Domon. He later becomes the new Black Joker of the Shuffle Alliance and is older than the other new members. One fighter who has a personal grudge against him is Neo-Canada's Andrew Graham who blames him for his wife's death, although it was only an accident. His crew is his warden, Nastasha Zabigov, who was assigned to watch him after Neo-Russia was forced to change their tactics. Nastasha does care for Argo though and at the end of the series, she deactivates his handcuffs and the bomb on his chest (a serious crime) so Argo can fight without holding himself back. His special techniques include the Gaia Crusher and Graviton Hammer.

Support crews 
  
 Domon's partner, she secretly and gradually falls in love with Domon, as she was his childhood friend. She is his crew member for the Thirteenth Gundam Fight, and boasts many talents. She is a renowned engineer and tactician, a decent sharpshooter and a skilled medic/doctor. Determined, she manages to put up with a brash Domon throughout the series enough so they accomplish their mission and fall in love, in a sense. However, things start to change between them when she learns the truth from Schwarz about her father's involvement in the Devil Gundam incident. After that, however, she decides to go back to Neo-Japan, and ends up kidnapped and forcefully placed in the cockpit of the Devil Gundam by her former boss, Major Wullube. Only by the joint efforts of Domon, the other Shuffle Alliance members and their crew, as well as Allenby, and many other Gundam Fighters, was she freed; mainly because of Domon finally admitting his love to her, which allowed Rein to break her self-imposed emotional barriers and control of the Devil Gundam over her body. She also piloted the Shining Gundam on two occasions and later piloted the Rising Gundam during the Battle Royale. 

  
They were all formerly street gang members that stowed away on a colonist ship and were almost caught. But Chibodee managed to rescue them from certain legal trouble for stowing away, with them serving him in any way they can to repay the favor, even if it was less than legal, such as when Chibodee was disturbed after their first encounter with the Devil Gundam: they went to the Guyana Highlands to steal the data on the Shining Gundam in order to encourage Chibodee to train. They, along with all the other respective Shuffle Member's crews, backed up the Shuffle Alliance in Argo's pirate ship during the final fight against the Devil Gundam.

   
 Neo-China's support crew and surrogate guardians to Tsai T'zu Hsi, a pair of Shaolin monks who are serious and spend most of their energy and time keeping the high spirited T'zu Hsi out of trouble. They are excellent martial artists and in desperation, once kidnapped Rein Mikamura in order to get Domon to defeat an impostor who stole the Dragon Gundam and posed as T'zu Hsi. Another time was after T'zu Hsi refused to train after their first encounter with the Devil Gundam, so they were planning to use Argo Gursky to fight T'zu Hsi in order to help goad T'zu Hsi back into training by having him fight a strong opponent. They are often comic relief like their ward, and are old friends of T'zu Hsi's late father. Before he died, they promised to raise his son to revive the Shaolin Temple, a task that both they and T'zu Hsi take very seriously.

  
 The 14-year-old daughter of the current ruler of Neo-France, Maria Louise (Marie Louise in the English dub) is pretty tomboyish and is smitten with her country's Gundam Fighter, Georges de Sand. When Georges initially refuses a match with Domon Kasshu, the spoiled and willful Maria stages her own kidnapping with Domon's help in order to get Georges to consent to a match: Domon for the sake of a fight, and for Maria to feel as though Georges was fighting for her alone. Both get their wishes and Georges reveals that he knew it was staged the whole time, as Domon would not have been able to write the ransom note in French. She was sent back to the Neo-France colony by her father as punishment for the incident, but later showed up during the finals. She eventually matures enough to help the Shuffle Alliance along in their quest to destroy the Devil Gundam. When Maria Louise witnessed the undead Chapman murder a Neo England official, she and the other members of the Neo-France team were held at gunpoint when Michelo deactivated the part of the barrier that protected them from Chapman during his match against Georges and all of them were ordered to stay put or the rest of the barrier would be shut down. Georges was forced to protect them while Domon, Rein, and Allenby went to fix the barrier system. It was close, but they were narrowly able to reactive that part of the barrier in time. It is notable here that it was Maria that maintained a calm face during the crises despite her young age. Maria Louise then identified Wong as the other man in the murder by recognizing his ring, but was told by her father to forget the whole thing due to Wong's position. Maria Louise later not only helped in standing up to her father's selfish decision of not having Georges fight against Domon in the finals, but also aid the other support crews in breaking down an energy barrier in order to allow Rein and Schwarz through to deliver the truth to Domon Kasshu during the Battle Royale (due to her small size, she was the only one able to reach for the control of the barrier). She even used a gun turret to back the Shuffle Alliance up during the final fight against the Devil Gundam. 

  
 He serves as the butler to Neo-France's Gundam Fighter Georges de Sand, and has been with de Sand family for a very long time and was Georges's caretaker and fencing teacher. Although he doesn't have as big of a role as the other support crews, he has one occasion where he aided Domon and Rein with information on Georges's recent fight after his experience with the Devil Gundam, and how his mental state has changed for the worse. Raymond was able to explain to them about how Georges's mental state is caused by his fear from the Marseilles tragedy, and how Raymond is willing to risk his career to see that Georges's mental state is returned to normal. Georges catches him in the act and fires him, but later rehires him after Raymond helps save Georges from his old enemy, Jean-Pierre Mirabeau. He pilots his custom NEL-75C Butler mobile suit, mainly for training with Georges when he is in Gundam Rose. Although it was ruined during the battle against Mirabeau, the Butler was repaired and was later used to retrieve Dr. Kasshu's space capsule at the end of series, and Raymond later sat beside Maria Louise in the gun turret that was next to him during the attack against the Devil Gundam colony.

  
 Argo Gursky's intimidating prison warden, she oversees all Neo-Russian matters in the Gundam fight. Even though she is easily half Argo's size, she manages to look far more threatening and bent on winning by any means to secure victory in spite of her part in helping the Shuffle Alliance. However, she eventually warms up to Argo and admits her own equal disgust towards Neo-Russia's methods. By the end of the Gundam Fight, Nastasha releases Argo and his crew, stealing the Neo-Russian ship the crew were brought in to battle the Devil Gundam. She resembles the Baroness from G.I. Joe.

Devil Gundam Corps 
  
 Kyōji Kasshu is the older brother of Domon Kasshu, who has been tracking him down since the start of the series, flashing his photograph to Gundam fighters. This is due to Domon believing that Kyōji created the Devil Gundam, betraying their family and nation as he escapes to Earth. In reality, Dr. Kasshu and Kyōji originally developed the mobile suit, originally called the Ultimate Gundam, to terraform the Earth and give it life. When Major Wullube Ishikawa of the Neo-Japanese military, who decided to use the Ultimate Gundam for his own evil schemes, attempts to confiscate the Gundam, Dr. Kasshu tells Kyōji to take the Gundam to Earth to keep it out of the hands of the military. In the ensuing chaos, Domon's mother was fatally shot when she shielded Kyōji from the gunfire from one of Wullube's soldiers as her son evades the Neo-Japan military to Earth while his father is sentenced as a scapegoat. However, the force of the landing on Earth corrupts the Ultimate Gundam's programming, causing it to believe that killing all humans is the only way to save the Earth as it absorbs Kyōji as its core, infecting him with DG Cells and using him to do its bidding. However, using what little free will he has left, Kyōji use the DG Cells on the corpse of the fighter of Neo Germany who was killed by the Devil Gundam, reanimating it into an android in his image, Schwarz Bruder.

 By the time Domon finds his brother at the ruin of Shinjuku, Kyōji is a shell of his former self when Domon attempts to reason with him. But due to the interference of Schwarz Bruder, Domon is able to build himself up enough to take on his brother again and believes to have killed him during the battle at the Guyana Highlands. However, the Devil Gundam survived and is brought to Neo-Hong Kong by Wong, with Kyōji's near-death body still in its core as Wong and Master Asia were searching for a new life core unit to replace him. During the Battle Royale on Lantau Island, Schwarz attempts to get Kyōji out of the weakened Devil Gundam, only to be grabbed to take his creator's place as he orders Domon to kill them both. Having finally reconciled with his brother, Domon tearfully does his Sekiha Tenkyoken and incinerates Kyōji and Schwarz, seemingly destroying the Devil Gundam. 
 

  
 Master Asia is Domon's mentor, legendary martial artist, and winner of the previous Gundam Fight.  His martial prowess and warrior spirit is stronger than any firearm or advance technology in the Gundam Fighter, after defeating Gentle Chapman for the title.  During his bouts, he would also go on to face Wullube and defeated him.  Master Asia is capable of seemingly impossible physical feats and can destroy mobile suits with a piece of cloth. Master Asia was the previous King of Hearts before he passed it on to Domon and vanished for a time. When Domon sees him again, they unite to fight the Death Army but soon become heated enemies when Master sides with the Devil Gundam. Although he sides with the Devil Gundam he still cares about Domon knowing he wouldn't stand a chance against Schwarz Bruder who he thought was Kyoji after seeing his face in the Guyana Highlands. He taught Domon his ultimate technique so he could defeat Schwarz. The Gundam he used to win the previous Gundam Fight, Kowloon Gundam transforms into the Master Gundam. Master Asia also has a loyal horse, Fuun Saiki - which also uses a mobile unicorn robot controlled much in the same way Gundams are controlled by human fighters, and which Master Asia's Gundam uses as steed.

Representing Neo-Hong Kong, Master Asia does not join the Gundam Fight until the final round, as per the ruling of the Chairman of All Space, Wong Yun Fat. Domon vows upon hearing this to make it to the final round undefeated, so he can take Master Asia's title as Undefeated of the East. Despite his allegiance to the Dark Gundam, Master Asia still retains his honor as a fighter and it later put him at odds with Wong, because Wong would use dirty tricks to win a match.

Master Asia, having been diagnosed with an unknown terminal illness, and knowing he has a short time to live, decides to have Domon fight against the strongest opponents during the final matches of the tournament. This is to groom Domon into piloting the Devil Gundam after Kyoji and taking over the Devil Corps. Master Asia's wish is that Domon will help restore Earth to a pre-humanity state using the nanotechnology from the Devil Gundam. During the Twelfth Gundam Fight, Master Asia had grown disillusioned with the horrors that Earth had to endure during the Gundam Fight and that he'd contributed to it. To atone for this, he becomes a follower of the Devil Gundam, seeing it as the hope to reverse the damage done. He is the only member of the Devil Corps to pilot a Heavenly King without infection (his terminal illness prevented him from being absorbed by the Devil Gundam as he originally intended). Ultimately he dies in a peaceful state after Domon defeats him in the finals, having been convinced by Domon's words that his plan would have failed since he didn't consider that mankind is also part of nature. Master Asia makes one final appearance in the battle against Grand Master Gundam along with Kyoji, Schwarz, and Domon's mother, in a vision, where they urge Domon not to give up. After the Devil Gundam is ultimately destroyed, Master's horse Fuun Saiki appears, helping Domon and Rein to escape the destruction and return to Earth. 

The name "Tohofuhai"(東方不敗) comes from the antagonist Dongfang Bubai from the Chinese Wuxia novel The Smiling, Proud Wanderer.

  
 The Prime Minister of Neo-Hong Kong, Wong is the current leader of the Earth with no intention of giving up his power as he devises schemes behind the scenes to retain that power through the Devil Gundam. He is in league with Master Asia and even enlisted such disqualified fighters as Gentle Chapman and Michelo Chariot, desiring to beat down Domon by rigging his matches and pitting him against tough opponents with the circumstances stacked against him. While researching the Devil Gundam, Wong uncovered a few interesting details, which was summarized in a report that would later fall in the hands of Neo-Japan's Major Wullube about a female pilot being the key in unleashing the Devil's Gundam full potential. As a result, Wong saw Allenby Beardsley as the perfect instrument and uses her as a puppet later on in his schemes. But Wong is seemingly injured or killed (it is unclear which) in the crossfire during the battle between Rein (in the Rising Gundam) and Allenby (in the Walter Gundam). However, Wong is revived by the DG cells, and attempts to go into space in the Walter Gundam after Wullube who had taken the Devil Gundam. He runs into Domon, who was also attempting to pass through the atmosphere to the Neo-Japan space colony where the Devil Gundam was taken, he thwarts Domon's attempts to breach the atmosphere for a short time. Ultimately, he is beaten down for the last time when Domon quickly returns upon Fuun Saiki, using God Gundam's God Finger to finish him off. Though not before declaring no matter what attempts Domon & the others have against the Devil Gundam they are doomed.

  
 A veteran of many Gundam fights, and despite Master Asia's boasts, it is actually Gentle Chapman who has the greatest fighting experience in the Thirteenth tournament, with twenty years of Gundam fighting under his belt. He won three consecutive Gundam fights for Neo-England with the Britain Gundam before being defeated in the Twelfth Gundam fight by Master Asia. His aristocratic soldier nature as well as his sportsmanship have been an inspiration to Gundam fighters everywhere. However, the Chapman of today is a mere shadow of himself. In order to remain a shining hero to the people, armed with his new Gundam, John Bull Gundam (which was renamed to Royal Gundam in the dub), he has become addicted to stimulants and resorts to cheating tactics with the help of his devoted wife, Manon. Despite these cheating ways, he still speaks of the ugly truths of life and what it really means to be a fighter. He is later killed due to a drug overdose from taking too many stimulants during his match against Domon Kasshu. Eventually, he is resurrected with DG cells as an insentient shell of his former self, completely mute and only acting under direct guidance from another member of the Devil Corps. His Gundam also gained the ability to become the Grand Gundam, one of the Four Heavenly Kings, but was killed again by the teamwork of Chibodee Crocket and Georges de Sand who nearly died in the process. 

  
 An emotionally unstable and possibly bipolar Gundam fighter for Neo-Italy, the pilot of Neros Gundam, Michelo is ruthless and persistent in his goals. Unlike most other Gundam fighters, Michelo cares little for rules and sportsmanship and is one of the few Gundam Fighters from Earth. It is notable that most Earthnoids are at best hostile to known Gundam fighters and hold the fight itself in great contempt. When not engaged in a physically strenuous activity, he is often seen drinking wine or liquor.

 Michelo Chariot is a gang leader from Rome that uses his position as a Gundam fighter to do whatever he wants (as a Gundam fighter can't be charged for crimes involving destruction of property on Earth). He was chosen by his home nation to represent them purely because of his fighting prowess (in the manga, however, Officer Mezzina mentioned that he might have bribed someone). Taking a young girl hostage, Michelo attempted to kill Domon with the Neros, but challenged him instead when Domon summoned the Shining Gundam. He was the first victim to the Shining Finger and lost his head because of it. This sparked a severe, psychotic obsession with destroying Domon, for which Michelo would return to the finals, having 'sold his soul' to the Devil Gundam for its power boost. Through the finals, Michelo acted as a middleman for Wong, trying to turn Gundam fighters against the Shuffle Alliance and controlling Chapman's activities. Thus, Wong often refers to Michelo rather affectionately, but Master Asia disregards Michelo as little more than a pawn. His Gundam gained the ability to become the Gundam Heaven's Sword, one of the Four Heavenly Kings, but was killed by Tsai T'zu Hsi and Argo Gursky, who nearly die along with him. Many of his personality traits reference the infamous Roman emperor Nero.

Neo-Japan 
  
 A major in Neo-Japan's military and former Gundam Fighter from the Twelfth Gundam fight, Wullube was the mastermind behind the Devil Gundam incident when he led the siege against Kyoji Kasshu that resulted with his facial scar which forced him to place a metal plate on his face and thus resembles the Phantom of the Opera. After successfully framing Kyoji and silencing Dr. Kasshu, Wullube recovered Dr. Kasshu's research notes and was convinced by Dr. Mikamura that the Devil Gundam would resurface during the Thirteenth Gundam Fight. Using Dr. Kasshu's son, Domon, and Dr. Mikamura's daughter, Rein (much to Mikamura's protests) secretly as pawns, they would track down the Devil Gundam, using the Gundam Fight as a cover, with Wullube faking sympathy toward Domon and pulling favors for him. But once Kyoji is dead and the Devil Gundam acquired, Wullube uses Wong's notes to complete his agenda, making Rein the Devil Gundam's new life core unit as it absorbs the Neo-Japan Colony. In the end, Wullube willingly merges with the Devil Gundam's DG Cells and he completely loses his mind and body to it while fighting the Shuffle Alliance in the Grand Master Gundam and was able to outmatch them, until Wullube was killed when the Shuffle Alliance combined their energy to use a team attack to destroy Grand Master Gundam. He lays dying for a short time muttering on how resistance against the Devil Gundam is futile & that there's absolutely no hope in saving Rein before disintegrating.

  
 Other than being a close friend to Dr. Kasshu, he is also Rein's father, known as the original developer of the Shining Gundam. Because of his jealousy towards Dr. Kasshu, Dr. Mikamura played a part in the Devil Gundam Incident and felt guilty of his part in it since. When he attempted to silence a wounded Schwarz, Mikamura exposed himself to Rein as she was in the room at the time, revealing herself after learning the truth. Rein convinces her father that his foolishness had caused the innocent members of the Kasshu family to suffer, which leads him to reconsider his actions. After helping Allenby recover from the DG Cells, Mikamura apologizes to his daughter while revealing his intent to turn himself in for his crimes and acknowledging that he doesn't deserve to be her father. But when Wullube reveals to Mikamura his intent with Rein, Mikamura got shot when he attempted to have his daughter escape and tried to radio for help. In the end, the mortally wounded Mikamura who saw everything he did was for nothing sacrificed his life by releasing Dr. Kasshu's capsule into space, so they might have a chance against the Devil Gundam. Moments before his death, even though he knew he did not deserve such treatment, he pleads with Domon to save Rein and tell her to not blame herself for his past actions. Dr. Mikamura is voiced by Motomu Kiyokawa in Japanese and Byron Close in English.

Other characters 
  
 Schwarz Bruder is the mysterious Gundam fighter for Neo-Germany and ally of the Shuffle Alliance. Schwarz pilots the Gundam Spiegel, renamed the Shadow Gundam in the English-language version, Spiegel in German means mirror, and Schwarz is a master of "German ninjutsu". Schwarz first appears in the Shinjuku area of Tokyo after it is revealed that Master Asia has allied with the Devil Gundam. After the Devil Gundam withdraws from Neo-Japan, Schwarz helps train Domon Kasshu. He is shown to be a very skilled fighter as he is able to fight on par with powerful opponents like Master Asia during his first encounter, and it has been said that he beat the Shuffle Alliance members in the finals (minus Domon). During the final tournament, Schwarz is injured during a match with Domon. Domon was shocked to see that the unmasked Schwarz looked identical to his brother Kyoji. In fact, the name Schwarz Bruder can be translated from German to "black brother." In a hospital, Rein Mikamura learned the truth about Schwarz and Kyoji. Earlier in the tournament, the Devil Gundam defeated the real Schwarz. Using the last of his free will, Kyoji used the DG Cells to turn Schwarz's corpse into an android modeled after himself and assigned him to protect Domon and watch over him. During the Battle Royale on Lantau Island, the Gundam Spiegel was destroyed when Schwarz faced the Devil Gundam for the last time before dying himself when Domon used God Gundam to deliver the deathblow on the Devil Gundam. 

  
 Allenby Beardsley is the Gundam fighter for Neo-Sweden, one of the youngest fighters, and the only female fighter to make it to the tournament, who is the pilot of the Nobel Gundam, renamed as Noble Gundam in the English-language version, which is modeled after a sailor fuku-clad schoolgirl. Allenby's success was a gilded image behind a series of cruel military-run experiments to create the perfect Gundam fighter. Orphaned at a young age, she was taken in by the Neo-Swedish Space Forces and spent the majority of her life training. The key to her success was the Berserker System, which used radio frequencies to turn her into an uncontrollable savage. This boosted her fighting abilities by 120% and made her virtually unstoppable. Due to the controversy of using such a system, she remained relatively obscure until Wong Yun Fat put her against Domon to test her abilities.

 Allenby meets Domon in a gaming arcade where she beats everyone she comes across in a fighting simulator, but only ties with Domon. In her match with him, Domon was able to overload the Berserker System by reaching out to Allenby. While the resulting trauma caused Allenby to lose the match, the technicians behind the system discontinue its use, reasoning that Allenby no longer needs it. She becomes Domon's close friend, and even develops a 'crush' on him, all to the great distress and silent jealousy of Rein Mikamura. Master Asia at first thought Allenby was just a fighter who gets lucky, but after a match with Domon, Master Asia admits he was wrong about her and he thinks she has what it takes to be a great fighter. Allenby finds a common bond with Domon due to the fact that they became Gundam Fighters against their own will.

 Later, Wong would make a copy of the Berserker System and use it to disrupt Allenby's tag team match against Andrew Graham and Argo Gursky. He kidnapped her in the resulting chaos after the match and infected her with DG cells. By also using the Berserker System, he turned her into a devil to pilot the Walter Gundam. Wong intended to use her to pilot the Devil Gundam itself, but was stopped by Rein Mikamura. After becoming disinfected, she would return with Chyral to lead an attack against the Devil Gundam. In the final episode she, along with the Shuffle Alliance members, help Domon express his true feelings to Rein, resulting in the destruction of the Devil Gundam (She says "If you don't tell her I won't be able to fall in love with another person, Domon."). She can be considered the only surviving member of the Four Heavenly Kings.

  
 Chyral Mequirel is the Gundam fighter for Neo-Nepal. A returning fighter from the eleventh tournament, Chyral was back and heavily predicted to win with his Tantora Gundam. In the finals of the 11th tournament, his only armament, left-handed claws, became stuck in the ground, rendering him unable to dodge a volley of blasts from his opponent, Gentle Chapman and his John Bull Gundam, who by defeating Chyral became a three-time Gundam Fight Champion. The attack caused an explosion in the cockpit, rendering Chyral blind. He later returned in the thirteenth tournament to avenge himself against all fighters with the Mandala Gundam. Under the orders of the Nepalese government, he assassinated all Gundam fighters he was slated to face before the match. He had almost succeeded in killing Domon, but was stopped by Chibodee Crocket. In his match against Domon, he realized the error of his ways and withdrew from the Gundam Fight to seek atonement from the families of the people he murdered. He would later return along with Allenby and other Gundam fighters to assist the Shuffle Alliance in attacking the Devil Gundam. He also appeared as a playable character (piloting Mandala) in Super Robot Wars MX on the PS2, and its PSP port, Super Robot Wars MX Portable.

  
 Andrew Graham is the Gundam fighter for Neo-Canada and pilot of the Lumber Gundam, renamed as Grizzly Gundam in the English-language version. While Argo Gursky and his pirate crew were escaping from the space police, their ship collided into the station where Andrew and his wife, Norma were working as space police. Norma was sucked out into space despite Argo's attempt to rescue her. Andrew blamed Argo for the death of his wife and entered as a Gundam fighter in a quest for vengeance. Domon would later facilitate an unofficial match between Argo and Andrew, which resulted in a draw. Afterward, Nastasha explained Neo-Russia's ruling Norma's death as an accident. Andrew refused to believe this and returned to fight Argo in the finals. It wasn't until the two were matched against berserker Allenby that Andrew remembered the entire event; that it had been an accident. Realizing the error of his ways, he protected Argo by absorbing a permanently crippling blow from Allenby. Unable to pilot a Gundam any longer, he is last seen boarding a plane back to Neo-Canada for medical treatment.

  
 Stalker appears at the beginning of each episode of Mobile Fighter G Gundam from the second episode onwards to provide information about the plot of the episode (hence his name), as well as to provide information about the universe of Mobile Fighter G Gundam in general. Stalker also narrates the preview for the following episode which appears at each episode's ending.

References

G Gundam